Acton Reynald is a village in the north of Shropshire, England. The village is perhaps more of a hamlet in that it does not contain a public house, Post Office, or any other features typically associated with villages. It is in close proximity to the A49 which runs from Ross-on-Wye on the Welsh border to Bamber Bridge in Lancashire. The village backs on to RAF Shawbury and the village of Moreton Corbet to its east.

The village's largest building is Acton Reynald Hall, a former seat of the local landowning Corbet family, which was a private girls' school from 1919 to 1995 before reverting to being a private residence.  In the 1840s the whole existing village of Acton Reynold together with several farms was demolished to facilitate the creation of the parkland.

See also
Listed buildings in Moreton Corbet and Lee Brockhurst

References

External links
 
 

Villages in Shropshire